Amoria molleri is a species of sea snail, a marine gastropod mollusk in the family Volutidae, the volutes.

Subspecies
 Amoria molleri isabelae Bail & Limpus, 2001
 Amoria molleri molleri (Iredale, 1936)
 Amoria molleri reducta Bail & Limpus, 2001
 Amoria molleri vandenbergae Bail & Limpus, 2001

Description
The length of the shell varies between 45 mm and 110 mm.

Distribution
This marine species occurs from Northeast Australia to New South Wales, Australia.

References

 Bail P. & Limpus A. (2001) The genus Amoria. In: G.T. Poppe & K. Groh (eds) A conchological iconography. Hackenheim: Conchbooks. 50 pp., 93 pls.

External links
 

Volutidae
Gastropods described in 1936